Fasijan (also romanized as Fasījān and Fesījān; also known as Pīsījān) is a village in Simineh Rud Rural District, in the Central District of Bahar County, Hamadan Province, Iran. At the 2006 census, its population was 627, in 154 families.

References 

Populated places in Bahar County